Ealing is a suburb of London, England

Ealing can also refer to:

Ealing, New Zealand
London Borough of Ealing
Municipal Borough of Ealing
Ealing (UK Parliament constituency)

See also

Ealing Studios
Eling (disambiguation)